D.M.G. Grupo Holding S.A better known by its acronym DMG is a controversial Colombian company, intervened and disbanded since November 18, 2008 by the Colombian government, under the suspicion of money laundering and illegal money catchment by using the Ponzi scheme.

Structure
Unlike the pyramid scheme, people in DMG could buy a prepaid card from 100,000 Colombian pesos, which could be used to buy a wide range of articles and services offered by DMG subsidiaries. These products and services were all provided by DMG subsidiaries and they ranged from food and home appliances to cosmetic surgeries. five to seven months after purchasing the prepaid card, investors had the right to receive 75% to 150% of the money they invested in cash, according to the amount of money invested and how many new clients they had introduced to the company. According to the owner and president of DMG, David Murcia Guzman, this business is supported by the constant flow of money for selling new prepaid cards, and also by the profitability of the subsidiaries companies.

History
This controversial company is rooted in southern Colombia Department of Putumayo, where David Murcia implanted the basis of his business taking advantage of people's poverty as the population of this department used to get income by the production of cocaine, and other drugs supported by the Colombian guerrilla FARC and the AUC. Once former president Álvaro Uribe started a Coca eradication plan in 2002, the population saw in the Murcia's business (in 2003) a way to get easy money and support their families. The success in Putumayo lead Murcia to spread his business first in the Southwest of Colombia and then in the central zone of the country where the Colombian capital Bogotá is located. Murcia moved his company headquarters to Bogotá in a mall named Outlet, located on Autopista Norte and 198th Street on the north of the city, where hundreds of people used to go to acquire the prepaid cards and buy goods with the cards. David Murcia decided to back his company with a bunch of small companies, so he called his company D.M.G. Grupo Holding S.A, instead of the original DMG S.A. It is estimated that David Murcia and his bunch of new companies caught about One Billion Dollars, most of them lost in the Caribbean tax havens.

David Murcia used the revenue to expand his business to Venezuela, Ecuador, and Panama where his businesses were also disbanded by the local authorities. In Panama where Murcia used to live in 2008, it was reported that he lived a life of luxury and excesses, owning many luxury cars and yachts.

The scheme was based upon a Ponzi Pyramid; and it is alleged that drug money laundering was also involved.

In March 2009, Murcia made declarations through an interview made by a journalist from La Prensa (Panamanian newspaper of most circulation) about his "investments" (donations) to Democratic Revolutionary Party candidates Balbina Herrera and Roberto Velasquez (candidates for president and mayor of Panama, respectively) for their campaigns. He mentions in the interview that he gave the candidates $6 million ($3M each) in exchange for his protection by Panamanian authorities. For the Panamanian public the allegation of Murcia's bribes to politicians and government officials generated a great scandal and, even though corruption is perceived as common in Panamanian politics, investigations are being made to verify the facts mentioned by Murcia.

See also
Ponzi scheme
Confidence trick
Pyramid scheme

References

External links
 DMG TV History

Retail companies of Colombia
Pyramid and Ponzi schemes